Belgium was represented by Pierre Rapsat, with the song "Judy et Cie", at the 1976 Eurovision Song Contest, which took place on 3 April in The Hague. Rapsat was the winner of the Belgian national final for the contest, held on 21 January.

Before Eurovision

Avant Eurovision 
French-language broadcaster RTB was in charge of the selection of the Belgian entry for the 1976 Contest. Five songs competed in the final hosted by Jacques Mercier (the venue is currently unknown). The winner was chosen by a jury consisting of "experts" and members of the public. 

Only the winner was announced.

At Eurovision 
On the night of the final Rapsat performed 6th in the running order, following Luxembourg and preceding Ireland. At the close of the voting "Judy et Cie" had received 68 points from 11 countries, placing Belgium 8th of the 18 competing entries. The Belgian jury awarded its 12 points to contest winners the United Kingdom.

Voting

References 

1976
Countries in the Eurovision Song Contest 1976
Eurovision